On 12 October 1948, an Aeroflot Ilyushin Il-12 crashed during a scheduled flight from Baku Airport to Tbilisi Airport. All ten people aboard the aircraft died.

Aircraft 
The aircraft involved was a twin-engine Ilyushin Il-12 (serial number: 25-17, c/n 8302517). The aircraft's first flight was in 1948 and was given to the Uzbekistan division of Aeroflot with registration CCCP-Л1450. It had 274 flight hours when the accident happened.

Flight and the accident 
On 11 October, the aircraft took off from Tashkent on a flight to Baku and landed at Baku at 11:15 local time. Due to bad weather, the aircraft stayed overnight at Baku. The next day, the crew decided to fly to Adler via Yevlakh and Tbilisi, without ATC permission. Baku Airport was closed to incoming flights due to strong winds, but the head of the airport allowed the aircraft to take off despite the conditions and without briefing the crew. During the flight, the crew radioed that they could not establish a connection with the direction finder at Tbilisi Airport nor tune to the airport radio. ATC reported that the radio was working, but the direction finder could not detect the aircraft. The radio was turned on, but an incorrect call sign was given. At 12:13 the crew radioed that they were returning to Baku, but Baku ATC did not realize this. The crew then radioed their position, over the Yevlakh region and demanded the Yevlakh radio be turned on. This was the last message from the aircraft. Due to a malfunction of the automatic transmitter, messages were sent every 3-6 minutes of the normal 30 seconds. No further communications were heard from the aircraft.

Investigation 
The pilot probably attempted to straighten the route and fly to Tbilisi directly, but this brought the aircraft too close to the Caucasus Mountains. The wind was also blowing the aircraft towards the mountains. Due to the radio problems, the crew probably became disorientated and descended below the clouds, only to crash in the mountains. The wreckage has never been found.

References 

1948 in Azerbaijan
Aviation accidents and incidents in the Soviet Union
Aviation accidents and incidents in Azerbaijan
Aviation accidents and incidents in 1948
Accidents and incidents involving the Ilyushin Il-12
1948 in the Soviet Union
Aeroflot
20th-century disasters in Azerbaijan
1948 disasters in the Soviet Union